A demonstration in support of Ukraine is a demonstration held weekly in Estonia in front of the Embassy of Russia, Tallinn since 2014.

History
This has become the longest-lasting political demonstration in Estonia.

With flags, colorful placards and slogans, the demonstrators express their support for the unity of Ukraine and demand that Russia take responsibility for its role in the Donbas war, and the annexation of Crimea.

The weekly demonstrations have attracted much interest and support from passers-by, especially from the numerous foreign tourists visiting Estonia.

Due to the coronavirus pandemic, the weekly gatherings were temporarily suspended since 12 March 2020, resumed 4 June 2020 and will continue until Russian military forces are withdrawn from Donbass and the occupation of Crimea ended.

The organizers are the NGO "Support Ukraine" and members of the political party Isamaa.

References

External links
 Fotod: Vene saatkonna ees toimus järjekordne pikett Ukraina toetuseks, Postimees.ee, May 18, 2016
 Justiitsminister tunnustas Ukraina ühtsuse toetajaid, Ministry of Justice of Estonia, April 5, 2018
 Indrek Kuus, Vene saatkonna ees on pikette Krimmi toetuseks peetud juba viis aastat, ERR, October 2, 2019

Estonia–Ukraine relations
Events in Tallinn
Protests in Estonia
Reactions to the Russo-Ukrainian War
2010s in Estonia